André Paus (born 9 October 1965 in Weerselo) is a Dutch former professional footballer and manager

Career statistics

Club

Managerial 
As of 7 May 2022

Honours

Player
Júbilo Iwata
 J.League Cup: Runner Up: 1994

Manager
WKE

Hoofdklasse: 2006–07, 2008–09
SV Spakenburg

 Topklasse Zaterdag: 2011–12

Valletta
 Maltese Premier League: 2013–14
 Maltese FA Trophy: 2013–14

Enosis Neon Paralimni

 Cypriot Second Division: 2017–18

References

External links

odn.ne.jp

1965 births
Living people
Dutch footballers
Dutch expatriate footballers
Eredivisie players
J1 League players
Japan Football League (1992–1998) players
FC Twente players
Júbilo Iwata players
Kawasaki Frontale players
Expatriate footballers in Japan
Dutch expatriate sportspeople in Cyprus
Dutch expatriate sportspeople in Japan
Dutch expatriate sportspeople in Malta
Expatriate football managers in Cyprus
Expatriate football managers in Malta
People from Weerselo
Dutch expatriate football managers
Valletta F.C. managers
Anorthosis Famagusta F.C. managers
WKE managers
FC Lienden managers
Association football defenders
SV Spakenburg managers
Footballers from Overijssel